Sihota is a settlement some 10 km north-east of Komga and 26 km south-west of Butterworth, at the former Transkei border. Of Xhosa origin, the name is said to mean 'secluded place'.

References

Populated places in the Great Kei Local Municipality